Odyssey to the West is the third album by international progressive deathcore trio Slice the Cake.  It was self-released on April 1, 2016.  It was released simultaneously with Odyssey to the Gallows.  Both releases are part of a concept about a pilgrim who leaves his betrothed to find God.

Shortly after the album was released, the band disbanded due to it being released without composer Jack Richardson's permission. Slice the Cake later regrouped, releasing a live EP in 2020 that featured tracks from Odyssey to the West.

Track listing

Personnel

Slice the Cake
 Gaia Mason – lead vocals, words, concept, synthesizer, djembe.
 Jonas Johansson – guitars, bass, backing vocals, programing, production, artwork
 Jack "Magero" Richardson – compositions, orchestral arrangements, musical thematics

Additional staff
 Jake Lowe – compositions, guest guitar solo on track 3
 Michael Malyan - piano on track 8
 Simon Longe - additional drum composition
 JJ Polacheck - guest vox on track 4
 Laura Vine - guest vox on track 9
 Sol Sinclair - choral vox
 Galen Stapley - choral vox
 Dan Luces - additional vocal editing on all tracks
 Dylan Garrett Smith - artwork, layout and design for "Odyssey to the Gallows"

References

2016 albums